12 Play is the debut solo studio album by American R&B and soul singer-songwriter R. Kelly; it was released on November 9, 1993, by Jive Records. The album follows his tenure with R&B group Public Announcement, with whom he released one album, Born into the 90's (1992).  It went on to top the R&B albums chart for nine weeks straight, while reaching the second position on the US Billboard 200 chart.

The album features four singles including the sexually-themed singles "Bump n' Grind" (US, number 1), "Your Body's Callin'" (US, number 13), and the more overtly direct "Sex Me, Pts. 1 & 2" (US, number 20). The album serves as the first of a trilogy of albums Kelly released under the "12 Play" moniker including TP-2.com (2000) and TP-3: Reloaded (2005). Since receiving an initially mixed response from critics, 12 Play has received more favorable retrospective criticism.

Background
Following the success of Born into the 90's, as the member of the R&B group Public Announcement, Kelly began touring as an opening act for Gerald Levert and Glenn Jones. During the tour, Kelly said that he became frustrated with the poor lighting and empty seats during his set. To generate more attention during his set, Kelly began thinking of what would be his gimmick to take his show to the next level, something that would make people remember him. Kelly stated: "I thought about it for a couple of days, and I finally came up with a little skit, me just talking to the audience. At the point in the show where I would break down "Honey Love," I would start talking to the audience."

The audience yelled "YES!" and Kelly's piano player accompanied him with chords. Kelly then began the countdown, "One. We'll go to my room of fun." The "12 Play" gimmick became so big that when Kelly went to radio stations to promote Born into the 90's, the DJ's wanted to hear "12 Play." The demand for "12 Play" was so big that R. Kelly decided to create an album titled 12 Play. Kelly later said:

"I didn't really know if the album would be as successful as it has been, but I hoped that it would. I was really taking a chance with the concept of this album." – Kelly on the concept of the 12 Play album, 1994.
Musically, the album is a mixture of hip hop, hip hop soul, G-funk, new jack swing and R&B.

Track listing

Personnel
Credits adapted from AllMusic.

Timmy Allen – Bass, producer
DeAndre Boykins – Rap
Bobbie Broom – Guest Artist
Bobby Broom – Guitar
Tom Coyne – Mastering
Dr. Dre – Composer
Yvonne Gage – Unknown Contributor Role, Vocals (Background)
Ron Hall – Bass
Barry Hankerson – Executive Producer
Bruce Hawes – Composer
Keith Henderson – Guitar
James Hoffman – Digital Editing
Joseph B. Jefferson – Composer
Ray Kelley – Producer
Carey Kelly – Rap

Casey Kelly – Rap
R. Kelly – Arranger, Composer, Engineer, Mixing, Multi Instruments, Performer, Primary Artist, Producer, Rap, Vocals
Michael Logan – Organ, Piano
Mike Logan – Organ, Piano
Doug McBride – Assistant Engineer
Peter Mokran – Engineer, Mixing, Programming
Michael J. Powell – Guitar
Paul Riser – String Arrangements
Robin Robinson – Vocals (Background)
Charles Simmons – Composer
Jim Slattery – Keyboards
Stefon Taylor – Assistant Engineer

Chart positions

Weekly charts

Year-end charts

Certifications

Release history

See also
List of number-one R&B albums of 1994 (U.S.)

References

Further reading

External links
 12 Play at Discogs
 

1993 debut albums
Albums produced by Barry Hankerson
Albums produced by R. Kelly
Hip hop soul albums
Jive Records albums
New jack swing albums
R. Kelly albums